Lopinga is a genus of butterflies of the family Nymphalidae.

Species
 Lopinga achine (Scopoli, 1763) – woodland brown
 Lopinga catena (Leech, 1890) West China
 Lopinga deidamia (Eversmann, 1851)  China
 Lopinga kasumi (Yoshino, 1995) Taipaishan, Shannxi, China
 Lopinga dumetorum (Oberthür, 1890) China
 Lopinga eckweileri  Görgner, 1990  China, Sichuan, Nanping
 Lopinga fulvescens (Alphéraky, 1889) China
 Lopinga gerdae Nordström, 1934 China
 Lopinga lehmanni (Forster, 1980) China
 Lopinga nemorum (Oberthür, 1890) China

References
Lopinga, Tree of Life
"Lopinga Moore, 1893" at Markku Savela's Lepidoptera and Some Other Life Forms

 
Satyrini
Butterfly genera
Taxa named by Frederic Moore